Luis Monge may refer to:

 Luis Monge Espinel (politician) (born 1965), Ecuador
 Luis Monge (footballer) (born 1992), Argentine footballer
 Luis Monge (mass murderer) (19181967), Puerto Rican-American mass murderer
 Luis Alberto Monge (19252016), Costa Rican politician